Seddon Deaderick Bagley (31 December 1901 – 5 September 1981) was an Australian rules footballer who played with Footscray in the Victorian Football League (VFL).

Notes

External links 

1901 births
1981 deaths
Australian rules footballers from Victoria (Australia)
Western Bulldogs players